T. Kanakam (c. 1927 – 21 July 2015) was an Indian Telugu drama and film actress and singer between the 1940s and 1960s. She acted in some of the best known and most popular hit films of that period.

Biography
Kanakam was born in Kharagpur in 1927 and later relocated to Vijayawada. She started singing folk songs in All India Radio since childhood. She became famous for playing Nayakuralu Nagamma in Palnati Yudham and Sri Krishna in Kurukshetram dramas. She also played as Srirama, Chintamani and many more and toured the entire state playing the dramas. She is contemporary to Peesapati Narasimha Murty, Shanmukhi Anjaneya Raju, Kalyanam Raghuramaiah, Relangi, Madhavapeddi Satyam and others.

She sang some songs in the films including Cheyi Cheyi Kalupukora in Raksharekha and Bhale Doralaku in Shavukaru.

She received the Nandamuri Taraka Ramarao Theatre Art Award for 2004 from the Government of Andhra Pradesh. Kanakam died in 2015, aged 88.

Filmography

References

External links
 

1920s births
2015 deaths
20th-century Indian actresses
Indian women playback singers
People from Krishna district
Date of birth missing
20th-century Indian singers
Actresses from Andhra Pradesh
Actresses in Telugu cinema
Indian film actresses
Singers from Andhra Pradesh
Actresses in Telugu theatre
Indian stage actresses
20th-century Indian women singers
Film musicians from Andhra Pradesh
Women musicians from Andhra Pradesh
People from Kharagpur